Sjursnes is a village in Tromsø Municipality in Troms og Finnmark county, Norway. The village was the administrative centre of the old municipality of Ullsfjord which existed from 1902 until 1964.

The village is centered on agriculture and fishing.  The village has a grocery store, school, doctor's offices, and Ullsfjord Church.

References

Villages in Troms
Tromsø